Urien is a historical and legendary king in medieval Britain.

Urien may also refer to:

Urien (Street Fighter), character from Street Fighter III.
Urien of Gwynedd, character in the novels of Katherine Kurtz.
Brother Urien, character in The Cadfael Chronicles mystery novels, particularly in An Excellent Mystery.